Section 44 may refer to:
Section 44 of the Constitution of Australia
Section 44 Records, an independent record label
Section 44 (New South Wales), a power of the Rural Fire Service
Section 44 "stop and search" powers of the United Kingdom Terrorism Act 2000